Baqi (also Romanized as Bāqī) is a village in Maraveh Tappeh Rural District, in the Central District of Maraveh Tappeh County, Golestan Province, Iran. At the 2006 census, its population was 36, in 7 families.

References 

Populated places in Maraveh Tappeh County